Afroneta fulva is a species of sheet weaver found in the Congo. It was described by Merrett in 2004.

References

Linyphiidae
Spiders described in 2004
Spiders of Africa
Endemic fauna of the Democratic Republic of the Congo